Two Good Comrades is a 1933 German war comedy film directed by Max Obal and starring Paul Hörbiger, Fritz Kampers, and Jessie Vihrog.

The film's art direction was by Robert A. Dietrich and Bruno Lutz.

Cast

References

Bibliography

External links 
 

1933 films
Films of the Weimar Republic
1930s German-language films
Films directed by Max Obal
German black-and-white films
German war comedy films
1930s war comedy films
1933 comedy films
1930s German films